Sheikh Alhaji Mohamed Sanusi Tejan  (January 19, 1950August 17, 2016) was a revered Sierra Leonean Oku Sunni Muslim  preacher, Islamic scholar, Islamic theologist, architect, and the former Chief Imam of the  Jamiatul Atiq Masjid.

Sheikh Sanusi Tejan was one of the  most highly influential and one of the most  highly knowledgeable Muslim Scholars in Sierra Leone. He was highly knowledgeable of the Quran, the Hadith of Muhammad, and Islamic Jurisprudence, primarily the Maliki jurisprudence of Sunni Islam. He traveled extensively across Sierra Leone preaching about the Quran and the Sunnah of Muhammad.

Sheikh Sanusi Tejan was the Chief Imam of the Fourah Bay Mosque from 1996 until his death on August 17, 2016. Sheikh Sanusi Tejan was the  Muezzin of the Fourah Bay Mosque from 1989 until 1996, when he became the Chief imam. He gave Islamic lectures as special guess in several mosque and many Muslim occasions across Sierra Leone. He appeared on Radio and television preaching the teachings of  Islam.

He was also an architect and he was a long term employee of the Sierra Leone Ministry of Works in the 1970s and 1980s during Siaka Stevens and Joseph Saidu Momoh presidencies. However, he later resigned so to concentrate entirely on preaching and spreading  the teaching of Islam.

He was the most senior teacher at the prestigious Fourah Bay Madrassa Islamic school, a school he himself attended under the teachings and guidian of the highly influential Salafi Sheikh Alpha Sulaiman Carew. Sheikh Sanusi Tejan began studying the Quran at the Age of two, and he memorized the entire Quran at the age of twelve.

Sheikh Sanusi Tejan was born and raised in a deeply conservative religious Muslim family from the Oku community in Fourah Bay, a conservative Muslim neighborhood of Yoruba descent in Freetown, Sierra Leone. His father Alpha Abdul Karim Tejan was a Muslim Scholar himself.

For secular education, Sheikh Sanusi Tejan attended the Tower Hill Municipal Primary school in Freetown and the Methodist Boys High School also in Freetown.

When Sanusi Tejan died im August 2017, his funeral service was attended by many of Sierra Leone"s Islamic preachers, civil servants and politicians, including then opposition leader Julius Maada Bio, the current President of Sierra Leone.

References

External links
 http://www.thesierraleonetelegraph.com/fourah-bay-community-mourns-the-loss-of-imam-sanusi-tejan/

1950 births
2016 deaths
21st-century Muslim theologians
Oku people
Sierra Leonean imams
20th-century Muslim theologians
People from Freetown